Bucksburn Swimming Pool is a swimming pool in Bucksburn, Aberdeen, Scotland.

History 
The swimming pool opened on 20 November 1989. It was built at a cost of £900,000.

On 2 March 2023, it was announced that the pool would close on 16 April 2023 along with the Beach Leisure Centre following a £687,000 reduction in the yearly budget for Sport Aberdeen. The council stated that there were "significant issues" with the plant that would cose over £400,000 to fix. It stated that the site where the pool stands would be required for an expansion of Bucksburn Academy.

Facilities 

References 

Sports venues in Aberdeen
1989 establishments in Scotland
Swimming venues in Scotland